Shannon is a village in Carroll County, Illinois, United States. The population was 801 at the 2020 census, up from 757 at the 2010 census.

Geography
Shannon is located at  (42.152039, -89.740211).

Demographics

As of the 2020 census there were 801 people, 326 households, and 212 families residing in the village. The racial makeup of the village was 94.01% White, 1.12% African American, 0.25% Native American, 0.12% Asian, 0.75% from other races, and 3.75% from two or more races. Hispanic or Latino of any race were 4.74% of the population.

There were 326 households, out of which 43.87% had children under the age of 18 living with them, 56.13% were married couples living together, 3.37% had a female householder with no husband present, and 34.97% were non-families. 32.82% of all households were made up of individuals, and 20.55% had someone living alone who was 65 years of age or older. The average household size was 2.89 and the average family size was 2.29.

The village's age distribution consisted of 20.7% under the age of 18, 8.2% from 18 to 24, 21% from 25 to 44, 23.6% from 45 to 64, and 26.4% who were 65 years of age or older. The median age was 45.0 years. For every 100 females, there were 96.6 males. For every 100 females age 18 and over, there were 98.3 males.

The median income for a household in the village was $52,500, and the median income for a family was $67,500. Males had a median income of $41,776 versus $30,893 for females. The per capita income for the village was $30,005. About 4.7% of families and 6.8% of the population were below the poverty line, including 13.0% of those under age 18 and 7.6% of those age 65 or over.

Religion
Shannon is home to three churches, Shannon Baptist, St. Wendelin's Catholic and Bethel United Methodist.

Notable person
Alfred Babb (1858-1933), farmer, businessman, politician, lived in Shannon; he served as postmaster for Shannon.

References

External links
Village of Shannon

Villages in Carroll County, Illinois
Villages in Illinois